Franklin W. Stern is a fictional character in the DC Comics universe. He first appeared in Superman: The Man of Steel #27 (November 1993), and was named after long time DC writer Roger Stern.

Fictional character biography
Franklin Stern is the owner and publisher of the Daily Planet newspaper, taking over from the TransNational Enterprises consortium which itself succeeded the villainous Lex Luthor.

Stern is a long-time friend of the editor, Perry White, although they often disagree about politics. When falling profits force him to sell the newspaper, this allows Luthor to purchase it again, with dire consequences for the Planet and its staff. Shortly thereafter, the Planet is purchased by billionaire Bruce Wayne, who still owns the paper until 2011's The New 52 rebooted DC's continuity, with the Daily Planet shown as having been bought by Morgan Edge and merged with his Galaxy Broadcasting System.

At one point Stern dated the sister of Daily Planet reporter Ron Troupe, but the outcome of this relationship is not known.

In other media
Franklin Stern appears in the first-season episode of the TV series Lois & Clark: The New Adventures of Superman titled "The House of Luthor", where he buys out the Daily Planet. Stern is played by James Earl Jones. He is mentioned in season 2, including one-sided conversations with him on the phone but never appears again.

Franklin Stern appeared in Smallville season nine episode "Charade", portrayed by Blu Mankuma.

Footnotes

References
Franklin Stern at the Unofficial Guide to the DC Universe

Fictional newspaper publishers (people)
Fictional African-American people
Comics characters introduced in 1993